Cinema Management Group is an American company based in Beverly Hills, California that acquires licenses and distributes feature films, animations and documentaries. The company is noted for its catalog of internationally produced animated features that is sold to the world markets.

History 
The company was founded in 2003 by Edward Noeltner. In 2004 the company acquired the right for the CGI animated film Hoodwinked!: The True Story of Red Riding Hood. CMG expanded its genre distribution with the indie film Reeker and the sequel No Man's Land: The Rise of Reeker. CMG represents Moriah Films. Since 2004, CMG-licensed animated features have grossed over $400 million at the worldwide box office.

CMG has distributed the animated films Adventures in Zambezia, Hoodwinked!, Khumba, The Legend of Sarila, Ratchet & Clank, Loving Vincent, and Saving Santa over the past two decades.

CMG facilitated the joint production of the film Ainbo: Spirit of the Amazon between the animation houses of Peru and the Netherlands. The company has distributed the film to over half the world's cinema markets, with an anticipated release in 2021. Currently in production for release in the 2020s decade is Ainbo: Spirit of the Amazon; Seal Team by Triggerfish Studios; Panda Bear in Africa by Katuni and A-Films; Kayara by Tunche Films and Toonz Animation; Canterville Ghost by Toonz Animation and Melmoth Productions, UK; Proud Princess by Luminar Films; and Noah's Ark by Symbiosis Technologies and Gullane.

Executives
Edward Noeltner is the founder of Cinema Management Group. He has served as the President of Senator Films International in Berlin, Head of Television at Pandora Cinema in Paris, Senior Vice President of International Distribution at AB Svensk Filmindustri  in Stockholm/Paris, and Senior Vice President of Sales and Distribution at Miramax International. in New York. Noeltner has overseen the international sales and distribution of Academy Award-winning films such as Chicago, The Hours, Frida,  Shine, Kolya, Under The Sun, and Tango.

Expansion
In 2008, film producer Gray Frederickson (The Godfather) brokered the sale of CMG shares to The Cleveland Family Trust, managed by Brian and Jason Cleveland, to establish the CMG Acquisitions Fund.

Films distributed

Animated films 

Adventures in Zambezia
The Adventures of the  Little Prince
Hoodwinked!
Khumba
Killer Bean Forever
The Legend of Sarila
The Littlest Angel
Louis La Chance
Ratchet & Clank
Saving Santa
Ainbo: Spirit of the Amazon
Kayara

Feature films 

American Violet
Blood and Bone
Blood Out
Brotherhood
Carjacked
The Collection
The Collector
Creature
DeadHeads
Demoted
The Devil's Hand
Eden
Get Lucky
Go for Sisters
The Haunting of Molly Hartley
Hollywood Sex Wars
House of the Rising Sun
The Hunted
Iraq for Sale: The War Profiteers
Kelin
Liars All
No Man's Land: The Rise of Reeker
No Tell Motel
Owl and the Sparrow
The Perfect Host
Pick Pocket (also known as Loosies)
Plastic
Reaching for the Moon
Reeker
Silent House 
Still Mine
A Stranger in Paradise
The Treatment
Under Still Waters

Documentary films 

All Together Now (previously licensed)
The Choir
Forks Over Knives
Gasland
Good Hair
Revolution
The Trials of Darryl Hunt
An Unlikely Weapon

Moriah films 

Echoes that Remain
Ever Again
Genocide
I Have Never Forgotten You
In Search of Peace
It Is No Dream
Liberation
The Long Way Home
The Prime Ministers 
Unlikely Heroes
Winston Churchill: Walking with Destiny

References

External links 
 
IMDB
Facebook

Film distributors of the United States
Film production companies of the United States
Companies based in California
Companies based in Beverly Hills, California